Jose F. Tosado is an American politician who served as a member of the Massachusetts House of Representatives from January 2015 to January 2021.

Career 
A resident of Springfield, Massachusetts, he was elected as a Democrat to represent the 9th Hampden district. He is a member of the Massachusetts Black and Latino Legislative Caucus. Tosado is a former president of the Springfield City Council.

In October 2014, Tosado was endorsed by The Republican, which noted "As a native of Puerto Rico, Tosado understands the special concerns of Latinos and will bring that voice to Beacon Hill."

Tosado had previously been an unsuccessful candidate in the 2011 Springfield, Massachusetts mayoral election.

See also
 2019–2020 Massachusetts legislature

References

1953 births
Living people
American politicians of Puerto Rican descent
Hispanic and Latino American state legislators in Massachusetts
Democratic Party members of the Massachusetts House of Representatives
Politicians from Springfield, Massachusetts
Massachusetts city council members
21st-century American politicians